A lipico or lipiko (plural : mapico or mapiko) is a mask or helmet of the Makonde of Mozambique.

Uses 
Mapico masks are worn for ceremonial dances during the rites of passage of circumcised boys called mapico dances. These masks are carved by master craftsmen, they are made of soft wood and often feature human hair. They represent faces of men or women with labrets or scarifications.

Gallery

References 

Mozambican culture
Masks
African clothing
African art
Masks in Africa